Dermomurex colombi is a species of sea snail, a marine gastropod mollusc in the family Muricidae, the murex snails or rock snails.

Description
The length of the shell varies between 8 mm and 13 mm.

Distribution
This marine species occurs off Martinique and the Lesser Antilles.

References

 Bouchet, P.; Fontaine, B. (2009). List of new marine species described between 2002-2006. Census of Marine Life.
 Merle D., Garrigues B. & Pointier J.-P. (2011) Fossil and Recent Muricidae of the world. Part Muricinae. Hackenheim: Conchbooks. 648 pp.

Gastropods described in 2006
Dermomurex